Kenneth "Kevin" Mullaney (born 23 September 1954), or more commonly known as KC, is a former American–born Welsh professional darts player who competed in the British Darts Organisation in the 1980s.

Career
He competed in the 1982 World Masters, losing in the first round to John Joe O'Shea. He also played in the 1983 BDO World Darts Championship, but was defeated in the first round by Swedish player Stefan Lord.

In 1985, Mullaney lost to Arnold Parke of Canada in the Windy City Open.

World Championship Results

BDO
 1983: Last 32: (lost to Stefan Lord 1–2) (sets)

References

American darts players
Living people
1954 births
Sportspeople from Cardiff
British Darts Organisation players